Sierra de Albarracín Comarca is a comarca in the Province of Teruel, Aragon region, northeastern Spain. It is located in mountain ranges of the Sistema Ibérico (Iberian System).

Geography
The Comarca de la Sierra de Albarracín is in an area formerly known locally as Tierra de Albarracín, roughly corresponding to the ancient Señorío de Albarracín feudal manor. Its capital is Albarracín, a town surrounded by stony hills that was declared Monumento Nacional in 1961.

This mountainous comarca is named after the Sierra de Albarracín, the main mountain range in this area of the Sistema Ibérico (Iberian System) of mountain ranges. The comarca includes other mountain ranges of the Sistema Ibérico also, foremost of which are the Montes Universales.

Municipalities
Albarracín, Bezas, Bronchales, Calomarde, Frías de Albarracín,Gea de Albarracín, Griegos, Guadalaviar, Jabaloyas,Monterde de Albarracín, Moscardón, Noguera de Albarracín, Orihuela del Tremedal, Pozondón,Ródenas, Royuela, Rubiales, Saldón,Terriente, Toril y Masegoso, Torres de Albarracín, Tramacastilla,Valdecuenca, El Vallecillo and Villar del Cobo.

See also
Albarracín
Comarcas of Aragon

References

External links 

Comarca de la Sierra de Albarracín official page
Sierra De Albarracín, Aragonese Government

Comarcas of Aragon
Geography of the Province of Teruel